Edward Hunter (born 9 June 1943) is a Scottish retired amateur footballer who made nearly 200 appearances in the Scottish League for Queen's Park as a wing half. He later managed the club for 15 years and in total served Queen's Park for over 30 years. Hunter represented Scotland at amateur level and made one friendly appearance for Great Britain.

Honours 
Queen's Park
 Scottish League Second Division: 1980–81

Career statistics

See also
List of one-club men in association football

References

Scottish footballers
Scottish Football League players
Association football wing halves
Queen's Park F.C. players
Living people
1943 births
Queen's Park F.C. managers
Association football central defenders
Scottish football managers
Scottish Football League managers
Scotland amateur international footballers
Footballers from Glasgow
People from Springburn